Zasów  is a village in the administrative district of Gmina Żyraków, within Dębica County, Subcarpathian Voivodeship, in south-eastern Poland.

The village has a population of 864.

Notable people 
 Teodor Talowski, Polish architect

References

Villages in Dębica County